Ambulyx pseudoclavata is a species of moth of the  family Sphingidae. It is known from Thailand.

References

Ambulyx
Moths described in 1996
Moths of Asia